Nadzeya Liapeshka (née Papok; ; Łacinka: Nadzieja Michajłaŭna Liapieška; born 26 April 1989) is a Belarusian sprint canoeist.

At the 2012 Summer Olympics in London, she won a bronze medal in the K-4 500 metres with teammates Volha Khudzenka, Iryna Pamialova, and Maryna Pautaran. At the 2016 Summer Olympics in Rio de Janeiro, she won bronze in the same event with Khudzenka, Maryna Litvinchuk, and Marharyta Makhneva. At the 2020 Summer Olympics, she won a silver medal in Women's K-4 500 metres.

She competed at the 2014 ICF Canoe Sprint World Championships, 2015 ICF Canoe Sprint World Championships, 2018 ICF Canoe Sprint World Championships, and 2019 ICF Canoe Sprint World Championships.

References

External links

1989 births
Belarusian female canoeists
Living people
Canoeists at the 2012 Summer Olympics
Canoeists at the 2016 Summer Olympics
Olympic canoeists of Belarus
Olympic silver medalists for Belarus
Olympic bronze medalists for Belarus
Olympic medalists in canoeing
ICF Canoe Sprint World Championships medalists in kayak
Medalists at the 2012 Summer Olympics
Medalists at the 2016 Summer Olympics
Medalists at the 2020 Summer Olympics
People from Pietrykaw District
Canoeists at the 2019 European Games
European Games medalists in canoeing
European Games silver medalists for Belarus
Universiade medalists in canoeing
Universiade gold medalists for Belarus
Canoeists at the 2020 Summer Olympics
Sportspeople from Gomel Region
21st-century Belarusian women